Camille Torrend (1875-1961) was a Portuguese clergyman and mycologist. He was active in France, Portugal, Ireland and Brazil. He was a professor of botany and phytopathology at the Imperial Agricultural School of Bahia.

Torrend described the fungi genera of; Amauroderma aurantiacum, Adustomyces, and Lignosus. 
The fungal genera of Torrendia (the family Amanitaceae) and Torrendiella (in the family Sclerotiniaceae) were both named after him.

Works 
 1908. Les myxomycètes. Étude des espèces connues jusqu’ici. Broteria 7: 5–177, tab., fig.
 1909. Notes de mycologie Portugaise. Résultats d’une excursion à la propriété royale de Villa Viçosa. Boletim de Sociedade Portuquesa de Ciencias Naturais 3: 3-7
 1912. Les Basidiomycetes des environs de Lisbonne et de la région de S. Fiel (Beira Baixa). Brotéria Ser. Botânica 10: 192-210
 1913. Troisième contribution pour l’étude des champignons de l’île de Madère. Brotéria Ser. Botânica 9: 65-181
 1913. Les Basidiomycetes des environs de Lisbonne et de la région de S. Fiel (Beira Baixa) [cont.]. Brotéria Ser. Botânica 11: 20-64
 1913. Les Basidiomycetes des environs de Lisbonne et de la région de S. Fiel (Beira Baixa) [concl.]. Brotéria Ser. Botânica 11: 54-98
 1940. As poliporaceas da Bahia e Estados limítrofes. Anales de la Reunión Sul-Amer. Bot. 1938 2: 325-341

Honors 
 El Herbario del Departamento de Micología, from Universidad Federal de Pernambuco
Genus of fungi
 Torrendia (1902),
 Torrendiella (1911),
Species of plants
 (Malvaceae) Bakeridesia torrendii Monteiro
 (Melastomataceae) Microlicia torrendii Brade

References 

Portuguese mycologists
Portuguese biologists
1875 births
1961 deaths